Siksanbayevo (Hikhänbay) is a rural locality (a village) in Ibrayevsky Selsoviet, Kugarchinsky District, Bashkortostan, Russia. The population was 104 as of 2010. There are 2 streets.

Geography 
Siksanbayevo is located 15 km northwest of Mrakovo (the district's administrative centre) by road. Staro-Almyasovo is the nearest rural locality.

References 

Rural localities in Kugarchinsky District